The South Fork of the Forked Deer River is formed at the confluence of Huggins Creek and Tar Creek in the southern part of Chester County, Tennessee, United States. It flows in a generally northern direction and passes just to the east of Henderson. It then runs in a northwesterly direction and enters Madison County and passes near Pinson. Flowing still generally north it passes through Jackson. It continues across Madison County and enters Crockett County, It flows in a northwest direction through the following counties sometimes passing in and out of a county several times. Haywood County, Lauderdale County and Dyer County where it joins with the North Fork. The Forked Deer then empties into the Obion River which in turn flows into the Mississippi River.

See also
List of rivers of Tennessee

References

Rivers of Tennessee
Bodies of water of Chester County, Tennessee
Bodies of water of Madison County, Tennessee